The 2019 GEICO U.S. Figure Skating Championships were held from January 18, 2019 – January 27, 2019 at the Little Caesars Arena in Detroit, Michigan. Medals will be awarded in the disciplines of men's singles, ladies singles, pair skating, and ice dancing at the senior, junior, novice, intermediate, and juvenile levels. The results will be part of the U.S. selection criteria for the 2019 Four Continents Championships, 2019 World Junior Championships, and the 2019 World Championships.

Detroit was announced as the host in November 2017.

Qualifying 
Competitors qualified at regional and sectional competitions, held from October to November 2018, or earned a bye. The top four finishers in each discipline at sectionals earned a spot at the National Figure Skating Championships. A list of qualified skaters was published on December 13, 2018.

Entries

Changes to preliminary entries

Schedule
The Little Caesars Arena, the home of the Detroit Red Wings which opened in September 2017, will host all junior and senior (Championship) level practices and competitions. The Detroit Skating Club will host all Juvenile, Intermediate and Novice practice sessions and competitions from January 18 – 22, 2019.

Medal summary

Senior

Junior

Novice

Intermediate

Juvenile

Senior results

Senior men

Senior ladies

Senior pairs

Senior ice dance

Junior results

Junior men

Junior ladies

Junior pairs

Junior ice dance

Novice results

Novice men

Novice ladies

Novice pairs

Novice ice dance

International team selections

World Championships 
U.S. Figure Skating began announcing the team for the 2019 World Championships on January 26.

Four Continents Championships 
U.S. Figure Skating began announcing the team for the 2019 Four Continents Championships on January 26.

World Junior Championships 
U.S. Figure Skating began announcing entries for the 2019 World Junior Championships team on January 26. The men and ladies will be selected after a training camp. The men and ladies were announced on February 5.

U.S. Figure Skating invited the following skaters to a selection camp for Junior Worlds.

References

External links
 
 Competition Central at U.S. Figure Skating

U.S. Figure Skating Championships
U.S. Figure Skating Championships
U.S. Figure Skating Championships